Diego Moreno Garbayo (born 21 June 2001) is a Spanish footballer who plays as a right back for CA Osasuna.

Club career
Born in Cintruénigo, Navarre, Moreno joined CA Osasuna's youth setup in 2011, from hometown side CA Cirbonero. He made his senior debut with the reserves on 19 January 2020, starting in a 2–0 Segunda División B away loss against Real Valladolid Promesas.

On 24 March 2021, after already establishing himself as a starter for the B-team, Moreno renewed his contract until 2023. On 30 December of the following year, he further extended his link until 2024.

Moreno made his first team debut on 5 January 2023, coming on as a second-half substitute for injured Rubén Peña in a 2–1 away win over Gimnàstic de Tarragona, for the season's Copa del Rey. His La Liga – and professional – debut occurred four days later, as he played the full 90 minutes in a 0–0 draw at Athletic Bilbao.

References

External links

2001 births
Living people
Spanish footballers
Footballers from Navarre
Association football defenders
La Liga players
Primera Federación players
Segunda División B players
Segunda Federación players
CA Osasuna B players
CA Osasuna players